The AFC–CAF football play-off for the 2012 Summer Olympics was a football match between the fourth placed team from the Asian Football Confederation (AFC) and the fourth placed team from the Confederation of African Football (CAF). The match took place at the City of Coventry Stadium in the United Kingdom on 23 April 2012.

Match

Senegal  qualify for the 2012 Summer Olympics' final tournament.

Goalscorers

See also
 Football at the 2012 Summer Olympics
 Football at the 2012 Summer Olympics – Men's Asian Qualifiers
 2011 CAF U-23 Championship

References

play-off
Oly
Oly
Football